Green Fingers is a 1947 British drama film directed by John Harlow and starring Robert Beatty, Carol Raye and Nova Pilbeam.

The film title does not use the term green fingers in its normal context, alluding to an untaught and natural skill at growing plants, but rather applies it to the world of alternative medicine and the ancient concept of individuals being natural "healers".

Plot

Thomas Stone, a seaman on a fishing trawler, discovers that he has what appear to be healing powers when a crewmate is injured. He shows a natural aptitude as a healer.

He begins training formally as an osteopath, but his natural flair in combination with human sympathy causes him to treat the daughter of the family where he lodges two months before he is due to qualify. He cures her, enabling her to walk, but is thrown out of his studies as a result. He does, however, marry the girl. He also gets much press coverage for his cure - attracting many clients.

During his studies, he had waited on tables in a high-class restaurant. There he encountered Alexandra, the daughter of a doctor. Her father had failed to cure her constant headaches. She has much faith in Stone, and becomes his patron, also beginning an affair.

When he is asked to choose between his wife and Alexandra, he chooses his wife. Alexandra is furious. He refuses to believe her headache is real, and when she goes home her father is also unsympathetic. She commits suicide.

At the public inquest, he has to reveal his affair. Worse still, it is proven that his one diagnosis of a pituitary problem was wrong. If she had only been x-rayed it would have revealed an operable tumour. Stone has therefore effectively killed her. He is denounced as a quack.

His wife stands by him. Moreover, he is informed he can return to complete his studies and formally qualify, as this too would have avoided the tragedy.

On a boating trip near their home in Whitby, his wife becomes sick, and loses the power of her legs again. He wants to now wait until he is qualified or get in a professional. But she has faith in him and wants him to cure her.

The film ends with them walking hand-in-hand to Whitby Abbey with Jeannie clearly cured.

Production

It was made by British National Films at Elstree Studios with some scenes shot on location in Whitby in Yorkshire. The film's sets were designed by the art director Wilfred Arnold.

Main cast
 Robert Beatty as Thomas Stone
 Carol Raye as Jeannie Mansell
 Nova Pilbeam as Alexandra Baxter
 Felix Aylmer as Daniel Booth
 Moore Marriott as Pickles
 Brefni O'Rorke as Coroner
 Charles Victor as Joe Mansel
 Harry Welchman as Dr Baxter
 Edward Rigby as Albert Goodman
 Ellis Irving as Jones
 Olive Walter as Mrs Mansell
 Wally Patch as Dawson
 Daisy Burrell as Stone's Receptionist

References

External links

1947 films
1947 drama films
Films directed by John Harlow
British drama films
Seafaring films
Films shot at British National Studios
Films set in London
Films set in Whitby
Films shot in North Yorkshire
Films with screenplays by Jack Whittingham
British black-and-white films
1940s English-language films
1940s British films